This list of national parks of Madagascar includes all officially recognized protected areas as of 2015. The protected areas network of Madagascar is managed by the Madagascar National Parks Association (PNM-ANGAP). The network includes three types of protected areas: Strict Nature Reserves (IUCN category Ia), National Parks (IUCN category II) and Wildlife Reserves (IUCN category IV). This "Durban Vision", as it has been dubbed, involved broadening the definition of protected areas in the country and legislation has been passed to allow the creation of four new categories of protected area: Natural Parks (IUCN category II), Natural Monuments (IUCN category III), Protected Landscapes (IUCN category V), and Natural Resource Reserves (IUCN category VI). As well as allowing these new objectives for protected areas management, the new legislation also provided for entities other than PNM-ANGAP to manage protected areas, such as government ministries, community associations, NGOs and other civil society organizations, and the private sector.

System of Protected Areas

The protection of natural sites in Madagascar was initiated under the French colonial authority in 1927. These original sites were reserved for scientific research and were not open to the public. In 1971, the Malagasy government undertook a project to protect  of mangrove forests, the first national effort to protect Madagascar's marine ecosystems. In 1986 the government of Madagascar, with support from the IUCN and the World Wildlife Fund, initiated a twelve-year process to review and assess existing protected areas and others requiring protection to create an initial list of Madagascar's conservation priority areas. The Association Nationale pour la Gestion des Aires Protégées (ANGAP), established in 1990, was the first government agency created with the express purpose of expanding and managing Madagascar's protected areas.

The creation of a national park system began in 1991 with the first major national policies for environmental protection and moved through three phases before concluding in 2002 with the establishment of the Système des Aires Protégées de Madagascar (SAPM). As co-president of this commission, the World Wildlife Fund supports the government of Madagascar in managing the parks while also developing management partnerships with a broader variety of partners, including local communities, civil society and the private sector. In 2003, an additional 92 areas were identified as meriting the status of protected area; some of these have since been accorded an official protected status, while others are pending review. Ensuring the legal status and protection of the complete list of areas added to meet the Durban Vision commitment requires an updating of the law concerning protected areas, which was stalled following the political crisis of 2009.

The Malagasy government formed the Commission du Système des Aires Protégées de Madagascar (Commission for the Protected Areas System of Madagascar, SAPM) to work in partnership with the concerned government ministries (the Ministère de l’Environnement, des Eaux et Forêts [Ministry of Environment, Water and Forests] and the Ministère de l’Agriculture, de l’Elevage et de la Pêche [Ministry of Agriculture, Livestock and Fishery]). In March 2005, following a series of intensive collaborations with the IUCN and other international and local experts, the government put in place the current system of classification and legal protection for Madagascar's protected areas.

World Heritage Sites 
In 1999 the Tsingy de Bemaraha National Park was declared a UNESCO World Heritage Site.  In 2007 six other national parks were voted in as a joint World Heritage Site under the name Rainforests of the Atsinanana. These six parks are Marojejy, Masoala, Ranomafana, Zahamena, Andohahela and Andringitra National Park. UNESCO placed the Rainforests of the Atsinanana on the list of World Heritage in Danger on 30 July 2010 following an increase in illegal logging in the parks since 2009 as a consequence of political crisis in the country.

Protected Areas

Strict Nature Reserves (Réserves Naturelles Intégrales)

National Parks (Parcs Nationaux)

Special Reserves (Réserves Spéciales)

Other protected areas

References

Madagascar
 
National parks
National parks